Huang Wei was a general of the Republic of China.

Huang Wei may also refer to:

Huang Wei (businessman), Chinese real estate developer
Huang Wei (footballer), Chinese football player
Viya (influencer), or Huang Wei, Chinese social media personality
Wong Wai, or Huang Wei in pinyin, Hong Kong football player